Aleksey Dionisiev (born 21 April 1973) is a former Bulgarian-born Uzbekistani footballer who played as a defender.

International career
Born in Bulgaria, Dionisiev was one of several foreign-born players to represent the Uzbekistan national football team in 2002 FIFA World Cup qualifying. He scored on his debut, a 7–0 victory against Taiwan on 23 April 2001.

In 2001 Dionisiev received an Uzbek passport together with his compatriot Georgi Georgiev and made five appearances for the Uzbekistan national football team.

International goals
Scores and results list Uzbekistan's goal tally first.

Personal life
In 2007 Dionisiev married long-time girlfriend Zhenya Georgieva.

Awards
  Champion of Bulgaria – 2 times – 2000, 2001 (with Levski Sofia)
   Bulgarian Cup – 1 time – 2000 (with Levski Sofia)

References

External links

 Profile at LevskiSofia.info

1973 births
Living people
Bulgarian footballers
Uzbekistani footballers
Uzbekistan international footballers
First Professional Football League (Bulgaria) players
FC Maritsa Plovdiv players
PFC Levski Sofia players
PFC Cherno More Varna players
PFC Rodopa Smolyan players
OFC Vihren Sandanski players
Association football defenders
Eordaikos 2007 F.C. players
Expatriate footballers in Greece
People from Vidin